Sirigeri  is a village in the southern state of Karnataka, India. It is located in the Siruguppa taluk of Bellary district in Karnataka. Here Historical and Powerful Lord Sri Naganatheshwara, Lord Sri Parvatha Matha and Lord Sri Mano Siddi Vinayaka Temples and Sri Sirigeramma Temple are located.Historical place

Demographics
 India census, Sirigeri had a population of 10122 with 5084 males and 5038 females.

See also
 Bellary
 Districts of Karnataka

References

External links
 http://Bellary.nic.in/

Villages in Bellary district